Laura S. Walker State Park is a  state park in the U.S. state of Georgia.  Located near Hoboken and the Okefenokee Swamp, the park is named after Laura S. Walker, a Georgia writer, teacher, civic leader, and naturalist (she is most famous as the latter).  The park's location near the Okefenokee makes it home to many exotic plant and animal species, including alligators, great blue herons, and pitcher plants.  The park includes a  lake and a championship 18-hole golf course with a pro shop.

History
In the 1930s an effort was made to recognize Waycross, Georgia, conservationist Laura S. Walker for her work promoting forestry and other civic activities. At the urging of Georgia's senators, President Franklin D. Roosevelt issued a proclamation to establish the Laura S. Walker National Park in her honor. She was the only living person for whom a state or national park was named. In 1937, the federal government purchased distressed farmland for the park under a federal land utilization program authorized by the Bankhead-Jones Farm Tenant Act. Work on the park was undertaken by the Works Progress Administration and the Civilian Conservation Corps. In 1941, the national park was deeded over to Georgia, becoming the state's 13th state park.

Facilities
42 Tent/Trailer/RV Campsites
6 Cottages
7 Picnic Shelters
4 Group Shelters
1 Group Camp
1 Pioneer Campground
Swimming Beach
Kayak Rentals
Bicycle Rentals

Gallery

Annual events
Okefenokee 10K Race (March)

References

External links

Laura S. Walker State Park
U.S. Geological Survey Map at the U.S. Geological Survey Map Website. Retrieved January 8th, 2022.

State parks of Georgia (U.S. state)
Protected areas of Ware County, Georgia